The 1893 Buchtel football team represented Buchtel College in the 1893 college football season. The team was led by first-year head coach John Heisman.

Schedule

References

Buchtel
Akron Zips football seasons
Buchtel football